The Kiran Nadar Museum of Art (KNMA) is a private modern and contemporary art museum with locations in New Delhi and Noida. Established in 2010, it is India's first private museum dedicated to modern and contemporary art. The core collection of the institution comprises post-independence 20th century painters, but the museum holds exhibits of younger, contemporary artists as well. It is a multi faceted initiative, that helps promote art in public spheres and encourages art appreciation with an active collaboration between artists, schools  and the public.

The New Delhi location has about 18,000 sq ft of exhibition space and the Noida location has 13,000 sq ft.

History 
The birth of the museum started from an idea of making art more accessible to the larger public; which was sparked and nestled by avid art collector and philanthropist Kiran Nadar. The inspiration to establish India's first private museum exhibiting Modern and contemporary art came from institutions like Guggenheim, MoMA, and the Whitney, which all started out as private museums. At the heart of their mission desires to be an avenue for building an active and erudite audience on Indian art and culture not only through their innovative exhibitions that introduces the public to contemporary artists both nationally and internationally but also through workshops involving schools and colleges, art appreciation discourses, symposiums and public programs. The museum sponsored by the Shiv Nadar Foundation started out as a gallery created in the premises of HCL Technologies in Noida  which opened its doors to the public in January 2010 with an exhibition titled Open Doors. The exhibition comprises extraordinary works that Kiran Nadar collected over the last two decade signifying the relevant moment in the 20th century art. After a year it moved into South Court Mall, inaugurated with the exhibition Time unfolded where the work of 50 artists were displayed. The decision to create the space in a shopping mall served their larger aim of bringing visibility to modern and contemporary art from India and subcontinent. It could be made manifest by making it easier and more convenient for the average mall goers to visit. These conscious steps made by the museum spearheaded by Roobina Karode who has held the position of Director and Chief Curator since its inception is telling of its role as a public sphere driven by the aspiration of bridging the gap between the art and the public. Her curatorial work which has been monumental and challenging in creating more avenues and ideas wherein the assertion of the museum as a space for ‘dialogue and sustained interaction’  could be made possible.

Collection 
Kiran Nadar's passion of collecting art over the years propelled a desire in her to share her collection to the larger public, with an underlying concern of the lack of institutional spaces in India that allowed for such works of art to be displayed. This personal act of joy has resulted in an ever growing collection that now includes more than 4500 works ranging from the late 19th century till present day. The core collection holds historically important works acquired from various sources include artists ranging from celebrated Indian painters like Raja Ravi Varma and M. F. Husain to contemporary blue-chip artists like Anish Kapoor, and emerging artists. Other artists include A. Ramachandran, Arpita Singh, F. N. Souza, Jamini Roy, Jogen Chowdhury, Krishen Khanna, Manjit Bawa, N. S. Harsha, Ram Kumar, Rameshwar Broota, S. H. Raza, Subodh Gupta, Tyeb Mehta, and V. S. Gaitonde. Two of the most significant paintings acquired by Kiran Nadar that is now a part of the museum's permanent collection is Syed Haider Raza's seminal work Saurashtra which fetched a record 16.42 crore ($3,486,965) at the famous Christie’s in London in 2010. The second one was in 2015 where she bid 26.41 crore for the monumental 8 ft x 4 ft oil painting Birth (1955)  by F.N Souza , a painting considered one of his best.

Exhibition 
KNMA intent on, in the words of Kiran Nadar ‘demystifying art for the common man’ has situated itself as an exemplary standard for a new genre of museum that breaks away from conventional display practices. As it is located in the midst of a crowded space of a mall, the museum garners more visits from the common public as opposed to other museums that are independently located, frequented only by a section that is keen on viewing art. Keeping this in mind the museum has to provide exciting and new interventions to the existing and older art movements. The 34,000 square feet museum has housed several critically acclaimed exhibitions . The admirable permanent collection of the museum have made large scale retrospective exhibitions possible and loaned out paintings to both national and international museums. They have collaborated with state museums like Bihar museum in 2017 for a retrospective of Himmat Shah's prolific career and with The Metropolitan Museum of Art in 2016 for a showcase of Nasreen Mohamedi's large oeuvre. KNMA in a larger attempt to collaborate with private ad government art institutions all across the country have collaborated with the kochi Muziris biennale and Madhavan Nayar foundation for an exhibition titled Pond near the Field: Five artists from Kerala (12 December 2016 – 30 April 2017).

The retrospectives are a celebration of the lives of seminal modernist artists by highlighting important moments from their careers. The focus on a singular artist allows the public to recognise their relevance and trace significant trajectories in the history of Indian Art post independence. These exhibitions offer us a glimpse into the creative process of the artists, their personal struggles and aesthetic sensibilities that were constantly evolving. Diaries, sketches in note books, photographs and lesser known works are displayed to draw out these intrinsic details. Furthermore, lectures and symposiums are held to offer a deeper understanding behind the works and lives of these artists.

Saket

2013

Difficult Loves Series

 31 January - 8 December -  Nasreen Mohamedi  A view to infinity  A Retrospective  (1937-1990)
 31 January - 8 December - Amrita Sher-Gil The self in making 
 31 January - 8 December - Seven Contemporaries (Anita Dube, Bharti Kher, Dayanita Singh, Ranjani Shettar, Sheba Chhachhi, Sheela Gowda and Sonia Khurana)

2014

 (26 September - 21 December ) Nalini Malani You can’t keep acid in a paper bag a retrospective (1969-2014) in three chapters

2015

 ( 4–14 November 2016) Rameshwar Broota visions of interiority : the male body A retrospective (1963 - 2013)

2016

 (28 January - 30 June) Himmat Shah Hammer on the square (1957-2015), 
 (24 August - 20 December) Jeram Patel the dark loam : between memory (1930 - 2016)
 (16 July - 20 December) K. G. Subramanyan Anatomy lessons Artist. Pedagogue. Poet. Scholar (1930 - 2016)

2018

 (9 February - 20 July) Vivan Sundaram A Retrospective: Fifty Years Step Inside and You Are No Longer a Stranger

2019

 (4 December - 2018 - 11 January 2019) Jangarh Singh Shyam A Conjurer's Archive . 
 (30 January - 14 July) Submergence : In the midst of here and there Arpita Singh | Six Decades of Painting

Noida

2015

 (25 January - 30 October) Surendran Nair Drawings, Prints and Watercolours

The museum also provides a platform for upcoming artists to showcase their work and in concomitant creates a broader cognisance of the contemporary art world. These exhibitions are immersive in nature with concepts that provoke and challenge the visitor in the hopes of displacing the usual passive experience of a museum. They are constantly dealing with themes that challenges the role of the museum as a public sphere, wishing to expand its horizons from being a space that caters specifically to a curated class to be a meeting ground of different cultures and communities. Some important exhibitions that deal with such complexities are -

 Zones of Contact (18 January 2013 – 30 November 2013) held in Noida with 14 participating artists such as Amar Kanwar, Chittarprosad, H.G Arunkumar that imagines the museum as a site under construction, working around the changing representation of labour. Giving greater value to the artistic process rather than the finished product.
 Hangar for the Passerby (19 April 2017 – 28 February 2018) an exhibition where the main protagonist is the transient figure of the passerby. An assemble of collectivities, collectives, collaborative practices, and moments of transference across generations and groups artists practising in diner. It juxtaposes different models and proposals by different artists bring to light the investments that an artist goes through during collaborations and sociality. The souvenir shop as the main attraction serves as a meeting ground by revisiting and reenacting certain moments in the histories of institutions like Bharat Bhavan, J&K Academy of Art, Culture & Languages, Kala Bhavan. 

Moreover, in a few exhibitions the public is also introduced to more participative forms of viewing art through unique curatorial engagements with alternative and socially engaged art practices and concepts.

 What Place Is The Kitchen? What Place Is Community? (12 December 2018 – 12 January 2019) An exhibition of a year long project by Revue (Sreejata Roy and Mrityunjay Chatterjee) which showcases memory drawings, diaries, napkins and hand drawn cartographies. Through which the dynamic network of social relationships and friendships of an amorphous group of migrant women from the middle - east, different countries in Africa and Asia is made evident. The feeling of belonging is conjured up through the act of cooking and eating together. Curated by Akansha Rastogi to evoke the fluid sense of the word community, and how food is the greatest tool in bringing different worlds, cultures, tongues and geographies together.

The museum allows artists to stretch the potentiality of mediums by engaging with less explored terrains that are carefully researched much like an ethnographic study ; incorporating transformational senses beyond sight such as touch, sound, smell, energies, disrupting complacent movements by active participation.

 Delirium // Equilibrium videos, films and kinetic objects from the KNMA collection (19 August 2018 – 15 November 2018) The exhibition brings together the work of artist like Nalini Malani, Mithu Sen, Alia Syed, for a virtual journey presenting the transitory ad intermediary states of incoherence, anxiety and excess. The space of the museum is put to test by the varied scales and approaches that include a rare eight channel video installation, a forty - five feet long projection, an eighty- five minute long film to a twenty - four feet long table top with kinetic objects.
 Smell Assembly (September 2019 - March 2020) is a first of KNMA's small exhibitions ‘young artists of our times’ curated by Akansha Rastogi. An outcome of their commissioned artistic research and project ‘Smells of the City: scents, stench and stink’ taken up by Ishita Dey and Mohammad Sayeed in 2018. In their exhibition note they raise questions around the description of smell according to its material associations. The representation of smell and how to translate them into visual, aural mediums. Whether an olfactory map of Delhi would be possible and how social relations can be expressed and distinguished by smell. The exhibition is visual dive into an anthropologist's field diary through an olfactory experience of landscapes and memory scapes. The segregation of class and labour according to smell is revealed by bringing together walks, collections and annotations of smells from Majnu ka Tila, fish markets of Chittaranjan Park, ittr shops and spice market of Old Delhi.

Public outreach and participation 
KNMA as a public institution that places the diffusion of knowledge at the helm of their agenda conducts numerous educational activities to materialise the chairperson's philanthropic dream. The museum collaborates with schools, colleges, NGOs, trusts through screening of films, stimulating curatorial programs, curated walk, where artist themselves frequently head these programs. Series which encourages the interaction, and narrows the gap between artist and the public such as ‘Invitation for a coup’  which invites young artists curated by Akansha Rastogi to lead the audience into a discussion or a construction of their art practice. The space provides for stimulating questions around the introduction of certain keywords and doubts regarding their art making.The museum also conducts workshops for children and families to generate spaces where they can explore art together through hands on activities, gallery trails and story telling sessions. The activities are primarily to  encourage the youth to discover and ask more questions around the museum and the works of art. Academic level engagements are also organised through the Lectures/ Symposiums series which invites experts to provide insights and intervention that seek new possibilities for art historical debates and discussions in the globalised world with a focus on south Asian art.

International collaborations 
KNMA's international collaboration has helped underrepresented practices of artists such as Nasreen Mohamedi and Bhupen Khakhar gain international visibility which has evenled to new research and study.

Nasreen Mohamedi's retrospective in collaboration with the Museo Nacional Centro de Arte Reina Sofia, Madrid, Spain was held from September 2015 to 11 January 2016 and continued at the Metropolitan Museum of Art, New York, USA from March to June 2016. It was the first comprehensive showing of any Indian artist, it gave the platform to recognise her as an artist who was a distinct figure, breaking away from the dominant figurative - narrative mainstream practice. More than 130 paintings, drawing, photographs and rarely seen diaries, tracing the conceptual complexity and visual subtlety of the artist’s oeuvre were on display.

Bhupen Khakhar's work was also brought together works from around the world in collaboration with the Tate Modern, London , titled Bhupen Khahar: You can’t please all  Khakhar renowned for hs unique figurative style, the exhibition allowed the public to discover his extraordinary work of narrative paintings with influences ranging from devotional aesthetics and street culture to reopen painting and pop art. His work revealed his incisive observations of class and sexuality and also a journey of his inspirational story.

The museum's collection of Amar Kanwar's work were loaned to the Documenta14, the world’s largest and most prestigious quinquennial, opened in Athens and Kassel (10 June - 17 September 2017). The Museum also supported the production of his 85 minute film ‘such a morning’ 

The museum was also one of the primary sponsors of Nalini Malini’s first retrospective in Europe at the Centre Pampidou , Paris, France. A continuation of the retrospective of Malani's oeuvre You can’t keep acid in a paper bag  in the KNMA in 2014. An exploration of female subjectivity and a profound condemnation of violence.  The exhibition covered 50 years of creativity, from 1969 to present day.

India Pavilion in the Venice Biennale 
The second India Pavilion in the Venice Biennale's 124-year history was spearheaded by the Ministry of Culture (India), co-organised by Confederation of Indian Industry, curated by Roobina Karode, the director and chief curator titled Our Time for a Future Caring to mark the "150 years of Mahatma Gandhi" . It opened on 11 May in Venice, Italy and continues till 24 November 2019.

While Gandhi is the focal point, the artists explores wider themes from India's history and nationhood to broader investigations of agency and freedom. Linking it with Gandhi's philosophy through the interpretations of eight multigenerational artists from established modernist to contemporary artists - Nandalal Bose, M.F Husain, Atul Dodiya, Jitish Kallat, Ashim Purkasyashtha, Shakuntala Kulkarni, Rummana Hussain and GR Iranna.

References

External links 
 Kiran Nadar Museum of Art's Official Website

Modern art museums
Art museums established in 2010
Museums in Delhi
2010 establishments in Uttar Pradesh
Art museums and galleries in India
Museums in Uttar Pradesh